Christian "Speesy" Giesler (born 4 July 1970) is a German musician. He is best known for being the former bassist of Kreator, where he was a member of the band from 1994 to 2019. He appeared on eight studio albums with Kreator, from Cause for Conflict (1995) to Gods of Violence (2017), and at the time of his departure, he was their all-time longest-serving bassist, surpassing Rob Fioretti, who was part of the band for 10 years. Unlike Fioretti and his replacement Frédéric Leclercq, who have both played with a pick, Giesler was a fingerstyle bassist for live shows, though he used a pick on their recordings.

He originally used a Jackson Randy Rhoads custom bass guitar, and was later endorsed by Mensinger with his own signature model. Since 2016, however, he has begun endorsing ESP guitars with a custom bass guitar as well as the AX-104.

References

1970 births
Living people
Kreator members
German heavy metal bass guitarists
Male bass guitarists
German bass guitarists
21st-century bass guitarists
German male guitarists